Scientia Marina, formerly Investigación Pesquera, is a peer-reviewed academic journal on marine research published by Institut de Ciències del Mar de Barcelona (CSIC) since 1955. The journal is abstracted and indexed in the Science Citation Index, Current Contents/Agriculture, Biology and Environmental Sciences, Biosis, Food Science & Technology Abstracts, GEOBASE, DIALNET, and Scopus. According to the Journal Citation Reports, the journal has a 2020 impact factor of 1.576, ranking it 67th out of 110 journals in the category "Q3, Marine and Freshwater Research".

See also
 Open access in Spain

References

External links 
 
 

Publications established in 1955
Creative Commons Attribution-licensed journals
Oceanography journals